Keagan Girdlestone (born 30 April 1997) is a South African-New Zealand cyclist, who last rode for New Zealand amateur squad Team Frezzor Racing.

At the 2016 Coppa della Pace, Girdlestone crashed twice on a descent near Rimini, causing serious injuries. He was then transported to a hospital in critical condition. Due to this accident, the race was cancelled. Despite predictions by doctors that he would never race again, he competed in the 2017 Le Race (the event that he won in 2014) where he finished just inside the top 50.

Major results

2015
1st Overall Ronde des Vallées
1st Stage 1
1st Overall Rhône Alpes-Valromey Tour
1st Stage 1
 Oceania Junior Road Championships
2nd Time trial
4th Road race
4th Time trial, UCI Junior Road World Championships
2016
5th Time trial, South African National Road Championships

References

External links

1997 births
Living people
South African male cyclists
New Zealand male cyclists